Brec de Chambeyron (3,389) is a mountain of the Cottian Alps on the border between France and Italy. It is the second highest summit of the Chambeyron Massif, after Aiguille de Chambeyron and its sharp, rocky peak dominates the Upper Ubaye Valley. The word "Brec" or "Bric" in French is used for a mountain resembling a rocky tooth. It was first climbed in 1878 by Paul Agnel and Joseph Risoul.

References

Mountains of the Alps
Alpine three-thousanders
Mountains of Alpes-de-Haute-Provence
Mountains of Piedmont
France–Italy border
International mountains of Europe